The canton of Thue et Mue (before 2021: Bretteville-l'Orgueilleuse) is an administrative division of the Calvados department, northwestern France. It was created at the French canton reorganisation which came into effect in March 2015. Its seat is in Thue et Mue.

Composition

It consists of the following communes:

Audrieu
Bény-sur-Mer
Bucéels
Cairon
Carcagny
Colombiers-sur-Seulles
Creully sur Seulles
Cristot
Ducy-Sainte-Marguerite
Fontaine-Henry
Fontenay-le-Pesnel
Le Fresne-Camilly
Juvigny-sur-Seulles
Loucelles
Moulins en Bessin
Ponts sur Seulles
Reviers
Rosel
Rots
Saint-Manvieu-Norrey
Saint-Vaast-sur-Seulles
Tessel
Thaon
Thue et Mue
Tilly-sur-Seulles
Vendes

Councillors

Pictures of the canton

References

Cantons of Calvados (department)